Bangla is an alcoholic beverage made from starch and sold in West Bengal. There are government licensed counters to sell this beverage. Bangla is a distilled country liquor. Notable Bengali liquor names are Uran, Captain, Pincon Bangla number one, Sengupta's Punch, Sengupta's Spark, Tarzan, Dada, Wonder, etc.

Ingredients 
Bangla is made from grains such as sorghum, bajra and wheat.

Production and consumption 
According to the government data of 2015, 48% of the West Bengal state's market share is Indian-made foreign liquor (IMFL), 39% is the Bangla drink. 11% of the market share is beer and the remaining 2% are occupied by wine and other spirits. Bangla is generally consumed by those who cannot afford other more expensive alcohol. The market, however, has been increasing for domestic liquor; this is due to a combination of a change in government policy that allows Bengali liquor to be sold in more outlets, improved production, and packaging, and new marketing strategies.

The vast majority of excise revenue in the state of West Bengal is coming from cheap Bengali liquor. In the 2014-15 fiscal year, the figure reached 3,600 crore.

References

Indian alcoholic drinks
Indian drinks
Traditional Indian alcoholic beverages